Qatar Turkish School is a Turkish curriculum school based in Ain Khaled.  The school  is the first ever Turkish school to be opened in Qatar,  it officially opened in December 2016.   It is the only Turkish school in Qatar. The school is also relatively close to Doha British School, another school based in Ain Khaled.

References

Schools in Qatar
Qatar–Turkey relations